Park Yu-jin (born 25 June 1993) is a South Korean judoka. In 2018, she won the silver medal in the women's 78 kg event at the 2018 Asian Games held in Jakarta, Indonesia.

In 2017, she won one of the bronze medals in the mixed team event at the 2017 World Judo Championships held in Budapest, Hungary. She also competed in the women's 78 kg event where she was eliminated in her first match.

References

External links
 

Living people
1993 births
Place of birth missing (living people)
South Korean female judoka
Judoka at the 2018 Asian Games
Asian Games silver medalists for South Korea
Asian Games medalists in judo
Medalists at the 2018 Asian Games
Universiade medalists in judo
Universiade bronze medalists for South Korea
Medalists at the 2015 Summer Universiade
21st-century South Korean women